Alto Reno Terme is a comune in the Metropolitan City of Bologna, Emilia-Romagna, Italy. It was formed on January 1, 2016, after the merger of Porretta Terme and Granaglione.

References